The Avengers are a superhero team, published by Marvel Comics. Comprising many of Marvel's premier heroes, they "fight the foes no single superhero can withstand".

Human groups
 A.I.M.
 Enclave
 H.A.M.M.E.R.
 Hydra
 Maggia
 The Triune Understanding

Alien races
 Badoon
 Beyonders
 Dire Wraiths
 Kree
 Skrull

Teams
 Black Order
 Brotherhood of Mutants
 Circus of Crime
 Dark Avengers
 The Gatherers
 Legion of the Unliving
 Lethal Legion
 Masters of Evil
 Savage Land Mutates
 Serpent Society
 Sinister Six
 Sons of the Serpent
 Squadron Sinister
 U-Foes
 Wrecking Crew
 Zodiac (comics)

Individual enemies
 Abomination
 Absorbing Man
 Annihilus
 Arcade
 Ares
 Arkon
 Arnim Zola
 Attuma
 Awesome Android
 Baron Blood
 Baron Mordo
 Baron Strucker
 Baron Zemo
 Batroc the Leaper
 Beyonder
 Black Knight (Nathan Garrett)
 Black Mamba
 Blastaar
 Blood Brothers
 Chemistro
 Collector
 Constrictor
 Cottonmouth
 Count Nefaria
 Crimson Dynamo
 Deathurge
 Diablo
 Doctor Doom
 Doctor Octopus
 Dormammu
 Dragon Man
 Dracula
 Egghead
 Electro
 Enchantress
 Executioner
 Fixer
 Flag-Smasher
 Galactus
 Ghaur
 Goliath
 Grandmaster
 Graviton
 Green Goblin
 Grey Gargoyle
 Griffin
 Grim Reaper
 Growing Man
 High Evolutionary
 Hood
 Imus Champion
 Immortus
 Iron Maniac
 Iron Monger
 Justin Hammer
 Kang
 King Cobra
 Klaw
 Korvac
 Leader
 Living Laser
 Loki
 Madame Masque
 Mad Thinker
 Maelstrom
 Magneto
 Mandarin
 Master of the World
 Maximus
 Melter
 Mephisto
 Midgard Serpent
 Mister Hyde
 Mole Man
 Molecule Man
 Moonstone
 Morgan le Fay
 Moses Magnum
 Namor
 Nebula
 Norman Osborn
 Psyklop
 Puppet Master
 Radioactive Man
 Rattler
 Red Ghost
 Red Guardian
 Red Skull
 Rhino
 Ronan the Accuser
 Scarlet Centurion
 Sidewinder
 Screaming Mimi
 Space Phantom
 Star Stalker - A mutant Vorm
 Super-Adaptoid
 Super-Skrull
 Surtur
 Taskmaster
 Terminatrix
 Thane Ector
 Thanos
 Tyrak
 Ultimo
 Ultron
 Whiplash
 Wizard
 Whirlwind
 Wonder Man
 Ymir
 Zzzax

References

Lists of Marvel Comics supervillains
Enemies
Avengers enemies, List of